Dollar is a Lebanese Arabic-language streaming television series starring Amel Bouchoucha and Adel Karam. The plot revolves around Tarek, who is given the objective to come up with an idea to make a million dollar to launch of a new bank. It was released on August 8, 2019, on Netflix.

Cast
 Amel Bouchoucha
 Adel Karam

Release
Dollar was released on August 8, 2019, on Netflix.

References

External links
 
 

2010s Lebanese television series
Arabic-language Netflix original programming
Lebanese drama television series
2019 Lebanese television series debuts